Eigil Misser (22 April 1934 – 13 May 2021) was a Danish footballer. He played in two matches for the Denmark national football team in 1963.

References

External links
 

1934 births
2021 deaths
Danish men's footballers
Denmark international footballers
Place of birth missing
Association footballers not categorized by position